The Juno Awards of 1974, representing Canadian music industry achievements of the previous year, were awarded on 25 March 1974 in Toronto at a ceremony at the Inn on the Park's Centennial ballroom hosted by George Wilson of CFRB radio's Starlight Serenade programme.

No television broadcasts had yet been planned for the Junos, prompting the Canadian Recording Industry Association (CRIA) to plan an April 1974 ceremony entitled the Maple Music Awards. Amid some music industry criticism over the proposed competition of awards ceremonies, CRIA backed down from its own ceremonies in February 1974, about a month after the Maple Music Awards were announced. However, this situation forced Juno Awards founder Walt Grealis to prepare for television coverage of the 1975 Juno Awards.

Nominees and winners

Best Female Vocalist
Winner: Anne Murray

Other nominees:
 Shirley Eikhard
 Patsy Gallant
 Susan Jacks
 Ginette Reno

Best Male Vocalist
Winner: Terry Jacks

Other nominees:
 Keith Hampshire
 Gordon Lightfoot
 Bob McBride
 Murray McLauchlan

Most Promising Female Vocalist of the Year
Winner: Cathy Young

Other nominees:
 Linda Brown
 Donna Moon
 Marie Claire Seguin
 Donna Warner
 Nancy White

There were a total of six nominees announced in this category, compared with the normal five nominees in other categories. No explanation for this situation was indicated.

Most Promising Male Vocalist of the Year
Winner: Ian Thomas

Other nominees:
 James Leroy
 Tom Middleton
 Dave Nicol
 Michael Tarry

Best Group
Winner: Lighthouse

Other nominees:
 Edward Bear
 Gary & Dave
 The Guess Who
 The Stampeders

Most Promising Group of the Year
Winner: Bachman–Turner Overdrive

Other nominees:
 Bearfoot
 Chester
 Scrubbaloe Caine
 Wednesday

Best Songwriter
Winner: Murray McLauchlan, "Farmer's Song"

Other nominees:
 Dave Beckett and Gary Weeks, "Could You Ever Love Me Again"
 Skip Prokop, "Pretty Lady"
 Bob Ruzicka, "Dirty Old Man"
 Ian Thomas, "Painted Ladies"

Best Country Female Artist
Winner: Shirley Eikhard

Other nominees:
 Carroll Baker
 Lynn Jones
 Diane Leigh
 Donna Moon

Best Country Male Artist
Winner: Stompin' Tom Connors

Other nominees:
 Gary Buck
 Dick Damron
 Ray Griff
 Ian Tyson

Best Country Group or Duo
Winner: The Mercey Brothers

Other nominees:
 Alabama
 Family Brown
 Jim and Don Haggart
 Humphrey and the Dumptrucks
 Mercey Brothers

Folk Singer of the Year
Winner: Gordon Lightfoot

Other nominees:
 Bruce Cockburn
 Murray McLauchlan
 Dave Nicol
 Valdy

Most Promising Folk Singer
Winner: Dave Nicol
 Peter Foldy
 Joe Probst
 Bob Ruzicka
 Ken Stolz

Best Independent Record Company of the Year
Winner: True North Records

Other nominees:
 Axe Records
 Daffodil Records
 Marathon Records
 Smile Records

Top Canadian Content Company of the Year
Winner: GRT of Canada Ltd.

Top Record Company of the Year
Winner: WEA Music of Canada Ltd.

Top Promotional Company of the Year
Winner: A&M Records of Canada Ltd.

Nominated and winning albums

Contemporary Album of the Year
Winner: Bachman–Turner Overdrive, Bachman–Turner Overdrive

Other nominees:
 Can You Feel It, Lighthouse
 Danny's Song, Anne Murray
 From the Fire, The Stampeders
 Ian Thomas, Ian Thomas

Pop Music Album of the Year
Winner: Danny's Song, Anne Murray

Other nominees:
 Close Your Eyes, Edward Bear
 Gary & Dave, Gary & Dave
 Master Session, Moe Koffman
 Wish I Were a Plane, Laurie Bower Singers

Country Album of the Year
Winner: To It and At It, Stompin' Tom Connors

Other nominees:
 Countrified, Dick Damron
 Out West, George Hamilton IV
 Portrait, Family Brown
 Songs for Everyone, Ray Griff

Folk Album of the Year
Winner: Old Dan's Records, Gordon Lightfoot

Other nominees:
 Coast to Coast Fever, David Wiffen
 Country Man, Valdy
 Day to Day Dust, Murray McLauchlan
 Night Vision, Bruce Cockburn

Nominated and winning releases

Best Single (Pop)
Winner: "Seasons in the Sun", Terry Jacks

Other nominees:
 "Could You Ever Love Me Again", Gary & Dave (Gary Weeks and Dave Beckett)
 "Danny's Song", Anne Murray
 "Painted Ladies", Ian Thomas
 "Pretty Lady", Lighthouse

Best Single (Contemporary)
Winner: "Seasons in the Sun", Terry Jacks

Other nominees:
 "Bondi Junction", Peter Foldy
 "Carpenter of Wood", Cliff Edwards
 "Could You Ever Love Me Again", Gary & Dave (Gary Weeks and Dave Beckett)
 "Danny's Song", Anne Murray

Best Single (Country)
Winner: "Farmer's Song", Murray McLauchlan

Other nominees:
 "Highway Driving", Alabama
 "Carpenter of Wood", Cliff Edwards
 "He", Jim and Don Haggart
 "Dirty Old Man", George Hamilton IV

Best Single (Folk)
Winner: "Farmer's Song", Murray McLauchlan

Other nominees:
 "A Good Song", Valdy
 "Goodbye Mama", Dave Nicol
 "Simple Man", Valdy
 "You Are What I Am", Gordon Lightfoot

References

Notes

General

External links
Juno Awards site

1974
1974 music awards
1974 in Canadian music
1974 in Ontario